Vincenzo Giannusa (born 1 June 1981) is an Italian professional football coach and a former player.

Playing career
Giannusa moved from Fano to Parma on a free transfer in January 2013 and was immediately loaned out to Fondi.

Coaching career
On 6 December 2018 he was appointed head coach of Serie D club Marsala. After a 1-3 defeat against Cittanovese and only 15 points since the beginning of the season, Giannusa was fired on 4 December 2019.

External links

References

1981 births
Footballers from Palermo
Living people
Italian footballers
Association football midfielders
Palermo F.C. players
Carrarese Calcio players
Celano F.C. Marsica players
A.S.D. Cassino Calcio 1924 players
Potenza S.C. players
Latina Calcio 1932 players
Alma Juventus Fano 1906 players
S.S. Racing Club Fondi players
S.F. Aversa Normanna players
Vigor Lamezia players
S.S.D. Marsala Calcio players
Serie C players
Serie D players
Italian football managers